Nietzsche's Kisses is a postmodern novel by Lance Olsen, published in 2006 by Fiction Collective Two. It is a work of historiographic metafiction.

Plot
Nietzsche's Kisses is the narrative of Friedrich Nietzsche's last mad night on earth. Locked in a small room on the top floor of what would become The Nietzsche Archives in Weimar, one of the most radical and influential of nineteenth-century German philosophers hovers between dream and wakefulness, memory and hallucination, the first person, second, and third, past and present, reliving his brief love affair with feminist Lou Andreas-Salomé, his stormy association with Richard Wagner, and his conflicted relationship with Elisabeth Förster-Nietzsche, his radically anti-Semitic sister.

Narrative structure
The novel is written in narrative triads: a first-person section (comprising the real-time of Nietzsche's last few hours alive), a second-person section (comprising hallucinations experienced by Nietzsche), and a third-person section (comprising Nietzsche's attempt to narrativize his own life; that triadic pattern is repeated throughout the novel.

Reception
In an in-depth critical article, Electronic Book Review called Olsen's novel "quite remarkable," while Publishers Weekly said Olsen is a "fine and daring writer, equal to the material."

External links
Lance Olsen reads from Nietzsche's Kisses at The Writers Edge conference in Portland, Oregon (2007)
Interview (2006) with Lance Olsen about Nietzsche's Kisses, by The Nietzsche Circle
Interview (2006) with Lance Olsen about Nietzsche's Kisses, by Scott Esposito at PopMatters

References

Contemporary philosophical literature
2006 books
Metafictional novels
Historiography
Cultural depictions of Friedrich Nietzsche
Cultural depictions of Richard Wagner
Novels about philosophers
FC2 books